A country code second-level domain is a second-level domain to a country code top-level domain. Such a domain may be reserved by a domain name registry for the registration of third-level domains, or assigned to a third party as a subdomain.

Many countries implement additional classes.

See also
 Domain Name System
 Private sub-domain registry

References

External links
 The Public Suffix List

Domain Name System